Smitty's is a restaurant chain in Canada.

It may also refer to:
Smitty's (retailer), a defunct supermarket chain in Arizona